The Bolivian tapaculo (Scytalopus bolivianus) is a species of bird in the family Rhinocryptidae. It is found in Bolivia and Peru.

Taxonomy and systematics

The Bolivian tapaculo was formerly considered a subspecies of rufous-vented tapaculo (Scytalopus femoralis) but was separated based principally on differences in their vocalizations.

Description

The male is mostly dark gray with reddish brown flanks, vent, and crissum (the area around the cloaca). It has a variable amount of white on the crown of the head. The female is paler gray washed with brown above with a black-barred brown belly. The juvenile is similar to the female.

Distribution and habitat

The Bolivian tapaculo is found from Puno Province in southeastern Peru into Bolivia as far as Chuquisaca Department. It inhabits dense undergrowth in humid broadleaf forest.

Behavior

No information is available on the Bolivian tapaculo's feeding or breeding phenologies. Its song is a trill up to 15 seconds long  and its alarm call is rendered "kekekeke" . The female is thought to utter a high-pitched "brzk" .

Status

The IUCN has assessed the Bolivian tapaculo as being of Least Concern. Though its population number is not known and is thought to be decreasing, it does not meet the criteria for a more critical rating. It does occur in some national parks and preserves.

References

Bolivian tapaculo
Birds of the Peruvian Andes
Birds of the Bolivian Andes
Bolivian tapaculo
Taxonomy articles created by Polbot